Orvieto is a city and comune in the Province of Terni, southwestern Umbria, Italy.

Orvieto may also refer to:

 Orvieto (album), live album by pianists Chick Corea and Stefano Bollani 
 Orvieto DOC, Italian wine region located in Umbria and Lazio
 Orvieto Papacy, refuge of five popes during the 13th century
 Orvieto ware, in-glazed earthenware originally manufactured at Orvieto
 Laura Orvieto, Jewish Italian writer